Kerkakutas is a village in Zala County, Hungary.

Notable residents
 László Pintér, Hungarian politician, MP
 Antal Stevanecz, Slovene teacher and writer

External links 
 Street map 

Populated places in Zala County